John Joseph Michaels (July 10, 1907 – November 18, 1996) was a left-handed pitcher in Major League Baseball. Michaels pitched in 28 games for the Boston Red Sox in 1932, winning one and losing six while striking out sixteen batters.

Michaels was the grandfather of Major League outfielder Jason Michaels.

References

External links 
John Michaels - Baseball-Reference.com

1907 births
1996 deaths
Baseball players from Connecticut
Major League Baseball pitchers
Boston Red Sox players
Sportspeople from Bridgeport, Connecticut
Atlanta Crackers players
Bridgeport Bears (baseball) players
Buffalo Bisons (minor league) players
Little Rock Travelers players
Macon Peaches players
Montreal Royals players
Rochester Red Wings players
Rocky Mount Red Sox players
Scranton Red Sox players